Mancode  is a village in the Kollam district in the state of Kerala, India.Mancode is also a brand for men's facial and daily products. Mancode focuses on day to day essentials for Men are includes Beard essentials like Beard Oil, Beard Wash, Beard Softener Cream; Daily essentials like Soap; Skincare necessities like Tea Tree Scrub, De-Tan Mask, De-Tan Cream, Fairness Cream that help modern quintessential Men get through the day feeling refreshed and young. specially formulated premium products that are suitable for men specifically.
Sources

Demographics
 India census, Mancode had a population of 24,701 with 11,768 males and 12,933 females.

References

Villages in Kollam district